is an old province of Japan which existed for a brief period of time in the Nara period in what is now western Fukushima Prefecture.

History
Iwase Province was created during the reign of Empress Genshō.  The Yōrō Ritsuryo established the Iwase Province in 718 through the division of the Michinoku Province (Mutsu Province). It was composed of five districts, named Shirakawa (白河), Iwase (石背), Aizu (会津), Asaka (安積) and Shinobu (信夫).

The area encompassed by the province reverted to Mutsu at some point between 722 and 724. Some scholars have suggested that this may have been motivated by economic considerations.

Historical districts 
Aizu District (会津郡)
Asaka District (安積郡)
Iwase District (岩瀬郡)
Shinobu District (信夫郡)
Shirakawa District (白川郡, East Shirakawa)

See also
 Iwashiro Province, de facto brief reconstitution.
 List of Provinces of Japan

Notes

References
 Kodama. (1958). 図日本文化史大系 (Zusetsu Nihon bunkashi taikei). Tokyo: Shōgakkan.  OCLC 16308019

Other websites

  Murdoch's map of provinces, 1903

718 establishments
Former provinces of Japan

States and territories established in the 710s
States and territories disestablished in the 8th century
724 disestablishments
8th century in Japan